Bueno is a Spanish surname. Notable people with the surname include:

Abraham Bueno de Mesquita
Alberto Bueno, Spanish footballer
Alex Bueno
Abraão José Bueno
Amador Bueno
Bruce Bueno de Mesquita
Cacá Bueno
Carlos Bueno, Uruguayan footballer
Caterina Bueno
Daniel Mariano Bueno
Descemer Bueno
Francisley Bueno
Galvão Bueno
Gastón Bueno, Uruguayan footballer
Gustavo Bueno
José Bueno y Monreal
José Luis Bueno
Juan Bueno Torio
Luis Bueno
Luiz Bueno
Manuel Bueno
Maria Bueno
Nakor Bueno
Ricardo Bueno Fernández, Spanish politician
Rodrigo Bueno
Sebastián Bueno, Argentine footballer
Vincent Bueno

Spanish-language surnames